Helga Frideborg "Frida" Maria Stéenhoff, née Wadström (11 December 1865, in Stockholm – 22 June 1945, in Stockholm), was a Swedish writer and women's rights activist. She was a leading participant of the public debate of gender equality and a contributor of several radical progressive publications. She was engaged in the women suffrage movement and several humanitarian organisations. 

During World War II, she participated in anti-fascist work. Frida Stéenhoff was a leading central figure of the free love movement in Sweden, for birth control, sex and romance without marriage, and critical toward the institution of marriage, subjects for which she became controversially known by her debut novel: Lejonets unge (Lion's Child) from 1896. She is credited with having introduced the modern concept of feminism in Sweden with her publication Feminismens moral (Feminist Morality) from 1903. 

She used the male pseudonym Harald Gate. She was among the contributors to the feminist magazine Tidevarvet.

Frida Stéenhoff was born to the chaplain Carl Bernhard Philonegros Wadström (1831–1918) and Helga Westdahl (1838–1879) and the sister of the suffragist and writer Ellen Hagen. In 1887 she married the physician Gotthilf Stéenhoff.

Works

Novels and serials
 1902 - Det heliga arvet
 1904 - Öknen
 1911 - Kring den heliga elden
 1915 - Ljusa bragder och mörka dåd
 1918 - Filippas öden
 1937 - Objektiv stats- och könsmoral

Plays
 1896 - Lejonets unge
 1898 - Sin nästas hustru
 1900 - Ärkefienden
 1907 - Stridbar ungdom
 1908 - Den vita duvans samfund
 1910 - Den smala vägen
 1911 - Kärlekens rival

Essays and other publications
 1903 - Feminismens moral
 1904 - Den reglementerade prostitutionen
 1905 - Humanitet och barnalstring
 1905 - Varför skola kvinnorna vänta
 1907 - Fosterlandskänslan
 1908 - Penningen och kärleken
 1909 - Riktlinjerna i mitt författaskap
 1910 - Teatern och livet
 1910 - Det nya folket
 1912 - Minfru, fru eller fröken
 1912 - Äktenskap och demokrati
 1913 - Könsslaveri
 1915 - Krigets herrar - världens herrar
 1924 - Samtal med en borgmästare om prostitutionen (Tidevarvet 1924(2):8, s. 4, 5, 6)
 1924 - Ellen Key och Nikodemus (Tidevarvet 1924(2):49, s. 1, 6)
 1925 - Babels förbistring: angående befolkningsproblem ... (Tidevarvet 1925(3):7, s. 3)
 1925 - Bör nutidsmänniskan tro på drömmar? (Tidevarvet 1925(3):14, s. 4)
 1925 - Vad unnar han henne? (Tidevarvet 1925(3):17, s. 4 )
 2007 - Blott ett annat namn för ljus: Tre texter av Frida Stéenhoff (innehåller Feminismens moral, Ett sällsamt öde och Lejonets unge)

See also
 Alfhild Agrell
 Agnes von Krusenstjerna
 Sedlighetsdebatten

References

 Ahlund, Claes, "Krig och kultur i konservativ och radikal belysning. Annie Åkerhielm och Frida Stéenhoff från sekelskiftet till första världskriget", Samlaren, Uppsala, årg.126 (2005), s. 97-150
 H F (Frida) M Stéenhoff, urn:sbl:20046, Svenskt biografiskt lexikon (art av Ellinor Melander), hämtad 2016-01-03.

Further reading
 

1865 births
1945 deaths
20th-century Swedish journalists
Swedish women's rights activists
19th-century Swedish women writers
Pseudonymous women writers
20th-century Swedish women writers
19th-century pseudonymous writers
20th-century pseudonymous writers
Journalists from Stockholm